Santhosha Kanavukal is a 1985 Indian Tamil language film directed by R. C. Sakthi. The film stars Vijayakanth and Nalini. It was released on 1 February 1985.

Plot synopsis
Pandian loves Kalyani and decides to marry her. However, when he is diagnosed with a deadly disease, he persuades his best friend Kannan to marry Kalyani.

Cast 
 Vijayakanth as Pandian
 Nalini as Kalyani
 Rajesh as Kannan
 Sathyaraj as the villain
 Dheepa as Gowri
 V. S. Raghavan as Kalyani's father
 Vadivukkarasi as Kalyani's mother
 Thengai Srinivasan as Gowri's father
 S. S. Chandran
 Chinni Jayanth
 Silk Smitha

Soundtrack 
Soundtrack was composed by Shyam.

Reception 
Kalki gave the film a negative review.

References

External links 
 

1980s Tamil-language films
1985 films
Films directed by R. C. Sakthi
Films scored by Shyam (composer)